James Dodd (birth unknown – death unknown) was an English rugby union footballer who played in the 1870s, 1880s and 1890s. He played at representative level for Yorkshire, and at club level for Halifax, as a centre, i.e. number 12 or 13. Prior to Tuesday 27 August 1895, Halifax was a rugby union club.

Background
Jimmy Dodd was born in Kirkby Lonsdale, Westmorland, England.

Playing career

County honours
Jimmy Dodd won caps for Yorkshire while at Halifax.

Club career
Jimmy Dodd made his début for Halifax on Saturday 7 October 1876, and he played his last match for Halifax on Saturday 22 April 1893.

Honoured at Halifax RLFC
Jimmy Dodd is a Halifax RLFC Hall of Fame inductee.

References

External links
Search for "Dodd" at rugbyleagueproject.org
Search for "Dodd" at espn.co.uk

English rugby union players
Halifax R.L.F.C. players
People from Kirkby Lonsdale
Place of death missing
Rugby union centres
Rugby union players from Cumbria
Year of birth missing
Year of death missing
Yorkshire County RFU players